Idalia Ester Serrano Franco (born 22 August 1999) is an American-born Salvadoran footballer who plays as a goalkeeper for college team UCLA Bruins and the El Salvador women's national team.

Early life
Serrano was born in Fresno, California and raised in Mendota, California.

High school and college career
Serrano has attended the Mendota High School in her hometown and the University of California, Los Angeles in Los Angeles, California.

Club career
Serrano is a product of Sacramento United and Santa Clara Sporting in the United States.

International career
Serrano made her senior debut for El Salvador on 19 November 2021.

See also
List of El Salvador women's international footballers

References

External links

1999 births
Living people
Citizens of El Salvador through descent
Salvadoran women's footballers
Women's association football goalkeepers
El Salvador women's international footballers
Sportspeople from Fresno, California
Soccer players from California
Sportspeople from Fresno County, California
American women's soccer players
UCLA Bruins women's soccer players
American sportspeople of Salvadoran descent